Ghorbanali Dorri-Najafabadi (born 3 December 1950) is an Iranian politician and cleric. He is currently a member of the Assembly of Experts and also a member of the Expediency Discernment Council.  He was previously the Minister of Intelligence of Islamic Republic of Iran.

Career
Dorri-Najafabadi was the minister of intelligence in the cabinet of then president Mohammad Khatami. During his term of ministership, some journalists and reformist politicians were murdered by security agents, for which the Iranian government later charged his deputy, Saeed Emami, with orchestrating, claiming he had organized them independently. Dorri-Najafabadi resigned and was succeeded by Ali Younessi. The events were later named the "Chained Murders" by the reformist cabinet of President Mohammad Khatami.

After Mohammad Ismaeil Shooshtari, in 2005, he was the attorney-general of the Islamic Republic of Iran. He was succeeded by Jamal Karimi-Rad in the post.

In 2008, he said that toys such as the Barbie doll are "destructive culturally and social danger."

Compulsory hijab
Dorri-Najafabadi is a fierce advocate of compulsory hijab in Iran. At a Friday prayer sermon, he said, "Holocaust has been as a pretext to fight hijab."

See also 
Haghani Circle
List of Ayatollahs

References

External links

1950 births
Living people
People from Ray, Iran
Iranian ayatollahs
Iranian Holocaust deniers
Members of the Expediency Discernment Council
Members of the Assembly of Experts
Representatives of the Supreme Leader in the Provinces of Iran
Ministers of Intelligence of Iran
Central Council of the Islamic Republican Party members
Society of Seminary Teachers of Qom members
Ayatollahs